Töre (Kalix Language: te'or) is a locality situated in Kalix Municipality, Norrbotten County, Sweden with 1,099 inhabitants as of 2010.

Its harbour is the northernmost of the Bothnian Bay (and thus, of the Baltic Sea) that is accessible to commercial vessels. The European route E10 passes through Töre.

References

External links
 
 tore.city – Töre website
 www.facebook.com/tore.nu – Töre Facebook fanpage 

Populated places in Kalix Municipality
Norrbotten